Oakridge–41st Avenue is an underground station on the Canada Line of Metro Vancouver's SkyTrain rapid transit system. It is located at the intersection of West 41st Avenue and Cambie Street in Vancouver, British Columbia, Canada.

It serves the Oakridge area—consisting of a residential neighbourhood, streetside stores along Cambie Street, and the Oakridge Centre complex—and is within walking distance of Queen Elizabeth Park. The station is located  underground.

History
Oakridge–41st Avenue station was opened in 2009 along with the rest of the Canada Line and was designed by the architecture firm VIA Architecture.

Station information

Station layout

Entrances
The station entrance is located on the southwest corner of the intersection of West 41st Avenue and Cambie Street, adjacent to the entrance to the Oakridge Centre shopping mall.

Transit connections

The following bus routes can be found in close proximity to Oakridge–41st Avenue:

References

Canada Line stations
Railway stations in Canada opened in 2009
Buildings and structures in Vancouver
2009 establishments in British Columbia